is a railway station in the city of Tsubame, Niigata, Japan, operated by East Japan Railway Company (JR East).

Lines

Station layout
The station consists of one ground-level side platform serving a single bi-directional track.

The station is unattended. Suica cards, Niigata City's travel scheme, can be used at this station. Rail tickets can be purchased from automatic ticket machines.

History 
The station opened on 8 April 1984 in Yoshida which is now part of the city of Tsubame. With the privatization of Japanese National Railways (JNR) on 1 April 1987, the station came under the control of JR East.

Surrounding area
 
 Yoshida High School
Yoshida Middle School

See also
 List of railway stations in Japan

External links

 Kita-Yoshida Station information 
 Video: Iwamuro to Kita-Yoshida to Yoshida

Railway stations in Niigata Prefecture
Railway stations in Japan opened in 1984
Stations of East Japan Railway Company
Echigo Line
Tsubame, Niigata